A Fool There Was is a 1922 American drama film directed by Emmett J. Flynn and written by Bernard McConville. It is based on the 1909 play A Fool There Was by Porter Emerson Browne. The film stars Estelle Taylor, Lewis Stone, Irene Rich, Muriel Frances Dana, Marjorie Daw and Mahlon Hamilton. It was released on June 18, 1922, by Fox Film Corporation and is considered a lost film.

Cast           
Estelle Taylor as Gilda Fontaine
Lewis Stone as John Schuyler
Irene Rich as Mrs. Schuyler
Muriel Frances Dana as Muriel Schuyler 
Marjorie Daw as Nell Winthrop
Mahlon Hamilton as Tom Morgan
Wallace MacDonald as Avery Parmelee
William V. Mong as Boggs
Harry Lonsdale as Parks

References

External links

1922 films
1920s English-language films
Silent American drama films
1922 drama films
Fox Film films
Films directed by Emmett J. Flynn
American silent feature films
American black-and-white films
1920s American films